This is the discography of British electronic musician Flux Pavilion.

Studio albums 
 Tesla (18 September 2015)
 .wav (21 January 2021)

Extended plays

Compilations

 Circus One (presented by Doctor P & Flux Pavilion)
 Grand Central

Singles

As featured artist

Other releases

Remixes

Production credits

References 

Discography
Discographies of British artists
Electronic music discographies